František Štambachr or Štambacher (born 13 February 1953 in Čebín), nicknamed "Štambi", is a former Czechoslovak footballer, gold medalist with the Czechoslovak Olympic Football Team at the 1980 Summer Olympics in Moscow. He was considered as an allrounder who could play in almost every position of the midfield (especially left wing and defensive midfield).

Club career
During his youth Štambachr played for Sokol Čebín and KPS Brno. In 1972, he transferred to Dukla Prague (nowadays known as Marila Pribram). For Dukla he reached a total of 292 top league appearances and scored 31 goals. In 1977, 1979 and 1982 he became champion of Czechoslovakia, in 1981 and 1983 national cup winner. He spent the late years of his career playing in Greece for AEK Athens (7/1984-12/1984) and Apollon Athens (12/1984-6/1985).

International career
Štambachr played for Czechoslovakia a total of 31 matches, in which he scored 5 goals. He was part of the winning squad of the 1976 European Championship, where he did not compete. He also participated at the 1980 European Championship and the 1982 FIFA World Cup.

He played with the Olympic team in the 1980 Summer Olympics where they won the golden medal.

Honours

Dukla Prague
Czechoslovak First League: 1976–77, 1978–79, 1981–82
Czechoslovak Cup: 1980–81

Czechoslovakia
UEFA European Championship: 1976

Czechoslovakia Olympic
Summer Olympics: 1980

References

External links

Hall of Fame Dukla Praha profile

1953 births
Living people
People from Brno-Country District
Czech footballers
Czechoslovak footballers
Footballers at the 1980 Summer Olympics
Olympic gold medalists for Czechoslovakia
Olympic footballers of Czechoslovakia
Czechoslovakia international footballers
UEFA European Championship-winning players
UEFA Euro 1976 players
UEFA Euro 1980 players
1982 FIFA World Cup players
Dukla Prague footballers
Apollon Smyrnis F.C. players
AEK Athens F.C. players
Olympic medalists in football
Czechoslovak expatriate footballers
Expatriate footballers in Greece
Czechoslovak expatriate sportspeople in Greece
Medalists at the 1980 Summer Olympics
Association football midfielders
Sportspeople from the South Moravian Region